Arasadzykh or Arasadzikhi is a village in the Ochamchira District of Abkhazia, a partially recognized state claimed by Georgia. The 2011 Abkhazian census recorded a population of 409 people.

Population
The 2011 census recorded a population of 409. Of those 409, there were 401 Abkhaz, 1 Georgian, 1 Russian, and 6 others.

References

Populated places in Ochamchira District